Mytella charruana is a bivalve, commonly known as the charru mussel. This species was discovered  in Central and South America and by Alcide d'Orbigny, a French naturalist, in 1842. They are less than an inch long (2.5 cm), and range from brown to black in color.

Habitat 
The charru mussel is native to Panama, Argentina, Brazil and Venezuela, but is invasive to Southeastern U.S., the Philippines, Singapore, Thailand, and India. Specifically, the indigenous range of the mytilid Mytella charruana extends along the Eastern coast of South America from Venezuela to Argentina and in the Pacific from Sonora, Mexico to El Salvador. It is also said that they are native to the Galapagos Islands, the Pacific coast from Mexico to Ecuador and, again, the Atlantic coast from Argentina to Venezuela.

Climate tolerance 
Mytella charruana can survive best in temperatures from 20℃ - 23℃ with a survival rate of 83-88%, but have been found in temperatures between 13℃-36℃. Higher temperatures around 28℃ - 36℃ have about a 0-24% survival rate. Any temperature at or higher than 36℃ has a survival rate of 0%. There is low 38% survival rate in cold temperatures at 13℃.

Salinity tolerance 
Mytella charruana can survive at salinities as low as 2 ppt (parts per thousand) and as high as 22.5 ppt. They can also survive large fluctuations in salinity for long and short periods of time.

Morphology 
Mytella charruana contain byssal threads, these rope-like structures are made from collagen and act like tethers. Byssal threads can reach approximately 160% of a mussels length. These threads help mussels adhere to solid surfaces. Like other bivalves, M. charruana has a protective shell made from calcium. Two interior adductor muscles are used to open and close the shell.

Life cycle 
Mytella charruana has a spawning period between July and October. Embryos develop into free-swimming larvae, then mature into a bivalve veliger that resembles a small clam. The veliger matures, and under certain conditions may experience sexual reversal. Insemination and fertilization has not been observed in M.  charruana.

Ecology 
Mytella charruana is an epifaunal tropical and subtropical mussel colonizing rocky substrates in estuaries primarily along the Atlantic and Caribbean coasts of South America.

Feeding 
Mytella charruana feed on phytoplankton and deleterious materials which are macronutrients.

As an invasive species

History 
Since the charru mussel is Native in warmer climates, such as Central and South America, the species has  invaded other close by warm waters. M. charruana populations moved to southeastern United States, specifically Florida and Georgia and has since been found at these areas. The population density is much lower than that of their native habitats where M. charruana densities can reach to more than 11,036 mussels m−2.  In 2014-2015, M. charruana has been reported to have invaded the Philippines, specifically in Manila South Harbor, Manila Bay, Luzon Island. This species also referred to as Mytella strigata. Subsequently, these mussels have appeared in Singapore in 2016, in Thailand in 2018, and in India in 2019.

Dispersal vectors 
Charru mussels have great dispersal ability and appear to readily colonize a variety of habitats. This ability facilitated this mussel in becoming an important invasive species in several regions of the world.

References

Mytilidae
Bivalves described in 1842